The Third Kohl cabinet was the state government of the German state of Rhineland-Palatinate from 20 May 1975 until 2 December 1976. The Cabinet was headed by Minister President Helmut Kohl and was formed by the Christian Democratic Union. On 20 May 1975 Kohl was elected and sworn in as Minister President by the Landtag of Rhineland-Palatinate.

The reason for the short term was that Kohl switched to federal politics: he was the Union’s candidate for chancellor in the 1976 West German federal election, was elected to the Bundestag for the first time and then resigned as Minister President of Rhineland-Palatinate.

Composition 

|}

References 

Cabinets of Rhineland-Palatinate
Cabinet Kohl 3 (Rhineland-Palatinate)